The Inter-American Court of Human Rights (IACHR or IACtHR) is an international court based in San José, Costa Rica. Together with the Inter-American Commission on Human Rights, it was formed by the American Convention on Human Rights, a human rights treaty ratified by members of the Organization of American States (OAS). 

Pursuant to American Convention, the Inter-American Court works with the Inter-American Commission to uphold and promote basic rights and freedoms. It has jurisdiction within 25 of the 35 member states of the OAS that have acceded to its authority, the vast majority in Latin America. The court adjudicates claims of human rights violations by government and issues advisory opinions on interpretations of certain legal matters. Twenty-nine OAS members are also members of the wider-scale International Criminal Court.

Purpose and functions 

The Organization of American States established the Court in 1979 to enforce and interpret the provisions of the American Convention on Human Rights. Its two main functions are thus adjudicatory and advisory. Under the former, it hears and rules on the specific cases of human rights violations referred to it. Under the latter, it issues opinions on matters of legal interpretation brought to its attention by other OAS bodies or member states.

Adjudicatory function 
The adjudicatory function requires the Court to rule on cases brought before it in which a state party to the Convention, and thus has accepted its jurisdiction, is accused of a human rights violation.

In addition to ratifying the Convention, a state party must voluntarily submit to the Court's jurisdiction for it to be competent to hear a case involving that state. Acceptance of contentious jurisdiction can be given on a blanket basis – to date, Argentina, Barbados, Bolivia, Brazil, Chile, Colombia, Costa Rica, the Dominican Republic, Ecuador, El Salvador, Guatemala, Haiti, Honduras, Mexico, Nicaragua, Panama, Paraguay, Peru, Suriname, Trinidad and Tobago, Venezuela and Uruguay have done so (though Trinidad and Tobago and Venezuela have subsequently withdrawn) – or, alternatively, a state can agree to abide by the Court's jurisdiction in a specific, individual case.

Under the Convention, cases can be referred to the Court by either the Inter-American Commission on Human Rights or a state party.  In contrast to the European human rights system, individual citizens of the OAS member states are not allowed to take cases directly to the Court.

The following conditions must be met:
Individuals who believe that their rights have been violated must first lodge a complaint with the Commission and have that body rule on the admissibility of the claim.
If the case is ruled admissible and the state deemed at fault, the Commission will generally serve the state with a list of recommendations to make amends for the violation.
Only if the state fails to abide by these recommendations, or if the Commission decides that the case is of particular importance or legal interest, will the case be referred to the Court.
The presentation of a case before the Court can therefore be considered a measure of last resort, taken only after the Commission has failed to resolve the matter in a noncontentious fashion.

Proceedings before the Court are divided into written and oral phases.

Written phase 
In the written phase, the case application is filed, indicating the facts of the case, the plaintiffs, the evidence and witnesses the applicant plans to present at trial, and the claims for redress and costs.  If the application is ruled admissible by the Court's secretary, notice thereof is served on the judges, the state or the Commission (depending on who lodged the application), the victims or their next-of-kin, the other member states, and OAS headquarters.

For 30 days following notification, any of the parties in the case may submit a brief containing preliminary objections to the application.
If it deems necessary, the Court can convene a hearing to deal with the preliminary objections.
Otherwise, in the interests of procedural economy, it can deal with the parties' preliminary objections and the merits of the case at the same hearing.

Within 60 days following notification, the respondent must supply a written answer to the application, stating whether it accepts or disputes the facts and claims it contains.

Once this answer has been submitted, any of the parties in the case may request the Court president's permission to lodge additional pleadings prior to the commencement of the oral phase.

Oral phase 
The president sets the date for the start of oral proceedings, for which the Court is considered quorate with the presence of five judges.

During the oral phase, the judges may ask any question they see fit of any of the persons appearing before them. Witnesses, expert witnesses, and other persons admitted to the proceedings may, at the president's discretion, be questioned by the representatives of the Commission or the state, or by the victims, their next-of-kin, or their agents, as applicable. The president is permitted to rule on the relevance of questions asked and to excuse the person asked the question from replying, unless overruled by the Court.

Ruling

After hearing the witnesses and experts and analyzing the evidence presented, the Court issues its judgment.
Its deliberations are conducted in private and, once the judgment has been adopted, it is notified to all the parties involved.
If the merits judgment does not cover the applicable reparations for the case, they must be determined at a separate hearing or through some other procedure as decided on by the Court.

The reparations the Court orders can be both monetary and nonmonetary in nature. The most direct form of redress are cash compensation payments extended to the victims or their next-of-kin. However, the state can also be required to grant benefits in kind, to offer public recognition of its responsibility, to take steps to prevent similar violations occurring in the future, and other forms of nonmonetary compensation.

For example, in its November 2001 judgment in the Barrios Altos case – dealing with the massacre in Lima, Peru, of 15 people at the hands of the state-sponsored Colina Group death squad in November 1991 – the Court ordered payments of US$175,000 for the four survivors and for the next-of-kin of the murdered victims and a payment of $250,000 for the family of one of the victims.
It also required Peru:
 to grant the victims' families free health care and various forms of educational support, including scholarships and supplies of school uniforms, equipment, and books;
 to repeal two controversial amnesty laws;
 to establish the crime of extrajudicial killing in its domestic law;
 to ratify the International Convention on the Nonapplicability of Statutory Limitations to War Crimes and Crimes against Humanity;
 to publish the Court's judgment in the national media;
 to publicly apologize for the incident and to undertake to prevent similar events from recurring in the future;
 and to erect a memorial monument to the victims of the massacre.

While the Court's decisions admit no appeal, parties can lodge requests for interpretation with the Court secretary within 90 days of judgment being issued. When possible, requests for interpretation are heard by the same panel of judges that ruled on the merits.

Advisory function 

The Court's advisory function enables it to respond to consultations submitted by OAS agencies and member states regarding the interpretation of the Convention or other instruments governing human rights in the Americas; it also empowers it to give advice on domestic laws and proposed legislation, and to clarify whether or not they are compatible with the Convention's provisions. This advisory jurisdiction is available to all OAS member states, not only those that have ratified the Convention and accepted the Court's adjudicatory function. The Court's replies to these consultations are published separately from its contentious judgments, as advisory opinions.

Membership
The Convention entered into force in 1978. All Latin American countries but Cuba are members, as are Suriname and a few Anglophone countries in the Caribbean.

Trinidad and Tobago signed the Convention on 28 May 1991 but suspended its ratification on 26 May 1998 (effective 26 May 1999) over the death penalty issue. In 1999, under President Alberto Fujimori, Peru announced it was withdrawing its acceptance of the Court's jurisdiction. This decision was reversed by the transitional government of Valentín Paniagua in 2001.

Venezuela withdrew from the convention in 2013 under the Maduro government. On 15 May 2019, the National Assembly (opposition Guaidó government) nullified the withdrawal.

The Dominican Republic stated in 2014 that it was withdrawing from the IACtHR, the withdrawal would have come into effect the following year. However, the IACtHR notes that the withdrawal was never legally implemented, and as of its 2017 annual report, the IACtHR still counted the Dominican Republic as a member.

The United States signed but never ratified the Convention.

Composition 

The court consists of seven judges, held to the highest moral judgement who have a high competency in human rights law. These judges are elected to six-year terms by the OAS General Assembly; each judge may be reelected for an additional six-year term.

Recent policy changes state, when serving on the court, judges are expected to act as individuals, not representing their state. They must be OAS member states’ nationals; however, they do not need to be individuals of a state that has ratified the American Convention or accepted jurisdiction of the Court. Judges are required to recuse themselves from cases involving their home country. States parties are no longer permitted to name a judge ad hoc to their case if a sitting judge is not from their country. If a judge is a national of one of the State Parties to the case, the State Parties can only designate a judge ad hoc if there are inter-state complaints. In order to be nominated as a judge, one must be a national of a member state of OAS, a jurist, have the ‘highest moral authority’, have high competency of human rights law, have ‘the qualifications required for the exercise of the highest judicial functions in conformity with the law of the state of which they are nationals or of the state that proposes them as candidates’.

'Highest Moral Authority' is loosely defined by the ACHR as never having never been convicted of a crime, suspended or expelled from the legal profession, or dismissed from public office.

Judges are elected by State Parties to the Convention from a list of nominated candidates. Each State Party may nominate up to three candidates, but if nominating three, at least one of the three must be a national of a state other than the nominating state. The Secretary General of the OAS organizes the candidates alphabetically and forwards it to the State Parties. The election consists of a secret ballot, requiring an absolute majority of the State Parties to the Convention. Those who receive the most votes are elected.

After the Convention came into force on 18 July 1978, the first election of judges took place on 22 May 1979. The new Court first convened on 29 June 1979 at the Organization of American States Headquarters in Washington, D.C., United States.

Criticisms 

The Court's behaviour has also been criticized.  Among other issues, some authors have criticized the politicization of the Court. Furthermore, the process of nomination and election is a subject of criticism. It is not a transparent or accountable process at both the National and International levels. There is a push for the OAS to create an independent group in charge of evaluating candidates. Another independent group in charge of overseeing the national processes and ranking the candidates that is separate from OAS is a proposed initiative by scholars to address these criticisms. These would ensure that all candidates have been through two reviews on the National and International level before being able to be elected.

Fair representation when it comes to candidates is also a point of contempt. Scholars have stated that State Parties should strive for equal representation in terms of geographic sub-regions, different ethnic and cultural groups, and female and male judges; however, this should be done without straying from the high standards and qualifications required for candidates.

"Highest Moral Authority", a requirement for nomination, is often criticized because its vagueness. The necessary qualifications are not clearly defined and vary from country to country. The minimum age ranges from none to 45 years old and the number of years of experience ranges from 10–15 years and only Paraguay requires candidates to have a PhD.

Some of the latest criticisms come from Peru  and Venezuela.  Venezuela subsequently withdrew from the system after President Hugo Chávez declared the court's decision to rule Venezuela guilty of holding a prisoner in "inhumane" jail conditions as invalid. Up to then, Trinidad and Tobago had been the only state to withdraw.  Peru tried to do so, but did not follow the appropriate procedure.  The last of these criticisms is directed against the Court's decision in the case of the Mapiripán Massacre declaring that some people were murdered with the consent of the Colombian state, a few of whom were subsequently found alive.

Personnel

Current Judges

Former Presidents of the Court

Former members of the Court

Notable cases heard by the Court

See also
 European Court of Human Rights, regional court originally established in 1959
 African Court on Human and Peoples' Rights, regional court established in 2006
 International Criminal Court

References

Further reading
T. Antkowiak, A. Gonza, THE AMERICAN CONVENTION ON HUMAN RIGHTS: ESSENTIAL RIGHTS, Oxford University Press, 2017. 
T. Buergenthal, R. Norris, D. Shelton, Protecting Human Rights in the Americas. Cases and material, Kehl, N.P Engel Publisher. Verlag, 1995.
L. Burgorgue-Larsen, A. Ubeda de Torres, The Inter-American Court of Human Rights. Case law and Commentary, Oxford, OUP, 2011.
L. Hennebel, "The Inter-American Court of Human Rights: The Ambassador of Universalism", Quebec Journal of International Law, Special Edition, p. 57, 2011.

External links
Inter-American Court of Human Rights
IACHR case law and basic documents

 
International courts and tribunals
Intergovernmental human rights organizations
Organization of American States
Human rights in Latin America
Organizations established in 1979
Intergovernmental organizations established by treaty
Human rights courts
Courts and tribunals established in 1979